Jianping is a county in the west of Liaoning province, China, bordering Inner Mongolia to the north, west, and northeast. The population is approximately 580,000.

Administrative divisions
There are 11 towns, 20 townships, and one ethnic township in the county.

Towns:
Yebaishou
Zhulike
Jianping
Heishui
Kalaqin
Shahai
Wanshou
Haladaokou
Reshui
Laoguandi
Bei'ershijiazi Hui Town

Townships:

Climate
Jianping has a monsoon-influenced humid continental climate (Köppen Dwa) that barely avoids semi-arid designation (Köppen BSk), with hot and humid summers and rather long, cold, and very dry winters. More than two-thirds of the annual rainfall occurs from June thru August. The frost-free period lasts 120 to 155 days.

References

External links

County-level divisions of Liaoning
Chaoyang, Liaoning